Augustine Eugene Hornyak, OSBM (1919–2003) was the first Apostolic Exarch of the Apostolic Exarchate for Ukrainians in Great Britain.  He was one of the few English and Ukrainian bishops to attend the Second Vatican Council.

Early life
Bishop Hornyak was born on 7 October 1919 in Kucura, Voivodina in the Kingdom of Yugoslavia. In 1940, Bishop Dionisije Njaradi persuaded Hornyak to train for the priesthood and, in 1940, Hornyak was sent by the bishop to study in Rome, at the Pontifical Ruthenian College of St. Josaphat's.

Priesthood
Hornyak was ordained as a priest by Bishop Ivan Buchko on 25 March 1945.  Because Hornyak was unable to return to Yugoslavia, he continued his studies at Propaganda Fide University, obtaining postgraduate degrees in Canon Law and Theology.

Following advice from Bishop Narjadi and Daniel Ivancho, he served the Ruthenian Eparchy of Pittsburgh as a priest and as professor Canon Law and Sacred Theology.

In 1956, Hornyak entered the Order of St Basil the Great.  He made his Solemn Profession of Monastic Vows in 1960.

He died on 16 November 2003 in London, but buried in his place of birth Kucura in Serbia.

See also

Ukrainian Greek Catholic Church

External links
 GCatholic.org information
 Independent Catholic News article about Bishop Hornyak's death
Information page about Bishop Hornyak from the St Nicholas Ukrainian Catholic Church website
Obituary of Bishop Hornyak from Times Online

1919 births
2003 deaths
Bishops of the Ukrainian Greek Catholic Church
British Eastern Catholics
British people of Ukrainian descent
Order of Saint Basil the Great
Participants in the Second Vatican Council
Roman Catholic bishops in Yugoslavia
Eastern Catholic bishops in the United Kingdom